The Došnica river is a river in North Macedonia. It is a right tributary to the Crna Reka between Tikves Lake and the Vardar. It springs from Koprišnica Falls and Mount Kozuf. A hydroelectric power plant is located on the river at Čiflik, Demir Kapija.

References

Rivers of North Macedonia
Demir Kapija Municipality